Yngve Johansson (born 21 January 1929 – 2002) was a Swedish ice hockey player. He was part of the Djurgården Swedish champions' team of 1954, 1955, 1958, 1959, 1959, and 1962.

He played two World Championship tournaments for Team Sweden, in 1955 and 1959, with Sweden placing 5th both times.

References

External links

1929 births
2002 deaths
Djurgårdens IF Hockey players
Swedish ice hockey coaches
Swedish ice hockey goaltenders
Ice hockey people from Stockholm